Convertibles is the debut studio album by American producer/rapper Chuck Inglish. The album was released on April 8, 2014, through Inglish's own Sounds Like Fun Records via Dave Sitek's Federal Prism Records. Co-produced by Inglish and Incubus' Mike Einziger, the 13-track project features collaborations with Chance the Rapper, Action Bronson, BJ the Chicago Kid, Ab-Soul, and Mac Miller amongst others, along with fellow Cool Kids member Sir Michael Rocks and Canadian electro funk duo Chromeo.

Convertibles was preceded by three singles – "Swervin'" featuring Sir Michael Rocks and Polyester the Saint, "Came Thru/Easily" featuring Ab-Soul and Mac Miller, and "Legs" featuring Chromeo.

Critical reception

Upon its release, Convertibles was met with generally positive reviews. At Metacritic, which assigns a normalized rating out of 100 to reviews from critics, the album received an average score of 68, based on 10 reviews. David Jeffries of AllMusic gave the album four out of five stars, saying "If there's a complaint to be made, it's that Convertibles is lightweight when it comes to subject matter, and with the whole whirlwind of influences flying about, the album could be taken as a slick showoff session, but these party songs stick to the bones. Skillfully strung together by ringleader Inglish, these flights of fancy turn into a substantial party album with plenty of fun and flash, so think of a more indie Pharrell or a modern ride through the Pharcyde because Convertibles is that kind of awesome." Ronald Grant of HipHopDX gave the album three and a half exes out of five, saying "Even with many of the compelling and genre-altering moments found on songs like 'Prism', 'Mas o Menos', 'Glam' and 'Dream', and the refreshing old school flavor of songs like 'Money Clip' and 'Game Time', the general lack of cohesion dims Convertibles overall quality. Pair that with the fact that Inglish has always been known for enjoyably passable but not necessarily elite lyricism, and you're faced with an album that's fun and even at times challenging, but not as memorable as it should be. But give Inglish kudos for not balking to trends and being ballsy enough to venture far past the predictable and the stale with Convertibles. Frankly, it's a listen that's pretty enjoyable and well rounded. It could just stand to be a more tightly knit as a body of work." Larry Day of The 405 gave the album a 7.5 out of ten, saying "It may be a bit malnourished in thematic ingenuity – it's not as honest as Old or Oxymoron, or as celebratory as Acid Rap – but the allure comes from ingenious, inventive production."

In a mixed review, Michael O'Donnell of XXL gave the album an "L", saying "The 'Cool Kids' had a very distinct sound and it would have been easy for Inglish to retread his past. While he clearly still draws from what got him here, it's good seeing him reaching for a new sound, not wanting to be boxed into a particular style. The album, while slightly unfocused, does have its moments, and Inglish in particular, has revealed himself to be an artist to keep an eye on going forward." Pitchfork reviewer Renato Pagnani gave the album a 6.0 out of ten, saying "Because of this inherent charm, Convertibles ends up a low-stakes affair without being a low-quality one. And when you think about it, that's a pretty fair description of Inglish as an artist." In a less enthusiastic review, Matthew Davies of This Is Fake DIY gave the album two stars out five, saying "All things considered Chuck Inglish hasn't offered enough that's new or high quality enough to truly make a mark."

Track listing
 All tracks are produced by Chuck Inglish, except where noted.

Credits and personnel
Credits for Convertibles adapted from AllMusic.

 Ab-Soul – featured artist
 Action Bronson – featured artist
 The Alchemist – engineer
 Chuck Bein – engineer, guitar, producer
 Josh Berg – engineer 
 BJ the Chicago Kid – featured artist
 Jeff Bowers – A&R 
 Nick Breton – engineer, mixing 
 Buddy – featured artist
 Capangels – featured artist, vocals
 Benny Cassette – engineer, featured artist, vocals
 Chance the Rapper – featured artist
 Chromeo – engineer, featured artist
 Mike Einziger – engineer, executive producer, guitar, keyboards, mixing, producer
 Glenn Gonda – engineer, mixing 
 Bernie Grundman – mastering
 Todd "Toddfather" Heathcote – Pro-Tools 
 Jade <3 / Jade Hurtado – featured artist
 Chuck Inglish – drums, primary artist, producer
 Izzo – scratching
 Hassani Kwess – featured artist
 Carter Lang – bass 
 Vic Mensa – featured artist
 Mac Miller – featured artist
 Jack Minihan – A&R, management
 Troy Mitchell – assistant, engineer, mixing 
 Robert Peterson – guitar 
 Polyester the Saint – featured artist, keyboards, piano
 Retch – featured artist
 Sir Michael Rocks – featured artist
 Sabi – featured artist
 Nico Segal – trumpet 
 Ann Marie Simpson – violin 
 Macie Stewart – featured artist, vocals
 Sulaiman – featured artist
 Alex Tenta – creative director, design

Chart positions

References

2014 debut albums
Hip hop albums by American artists
Albums produced by Chuck Inglish